Lonnie George Johnson (born October 6, 1949) is an American inventor, aerospace engineer, and entrepreneur, whose work includes a U.S. Air Force-term of service and a twelve-year stint at NASA, where he worked at the Jet Propulsion Laboratory. He invented the Super Soaker water gun in 1989, which has been among the world's bestselling toys ever since.

Early life 
Johnson was born in Mobile, Alabama. His mother, who finished high school, worked as a nurse's aide and his father, who didn't finish high school, was a World War II veteran. His father explained the basic principles of electricity to Johnson at an early age. Stating that he "always liked to tinker with things," Johnson earned the nickname "the Professor" from kids in the neighborhood. He once "tore up his sister's baby doll to see what made her eyes close". He also tried to cook up rocket fuel in a saucepan but in doing so almost burned down the house.

As a teenager, Johnson attended Williamson High School, an all-black school in Mobile. He drew much of his inspiration from George Washington Carver. In 1968, Johnson represented his high school at a science fair in Alabama, where he was the only black student attending the fair; This was a time when African Americans had very little presence in science. There, he presented a robot he created, which he named "Linex," taking home the first-place prize. The robot was powered by compressed air.

In 1969, shortly after graduating from high school, Johnson attended Tuskegee University, obtaining a B.S. in mechanical engineering in 1973 and a master's degree in nuclear engineering in 1975. He also holds an honorary Ph. D. in Science from Tuskegee University. He then worked for the U.S. Air Force, where he worked on the stealth bomber program, before eventually joining NASA's Jet Propulsion Laboratory in 1979.

Career
During his time at NASA (1979-1991), Johnson worked on a variety of projects, including the Air Force missions Lab, developing the nuclear power source for the Galileo mission to Jupiter, several weapons-related projects, as well as an engineer on the Mariner Mark ll Spacecraft series for the Comet Rendezvous and Saturn Orbiter Probe missions. He also worked on the stealth bomber program.

In 1991, Johnson founded his own company, Johnson Research and Development Co., Inc., of which he is also the president.

More recently, he teamed up with scientists from both Tulane University and Tuskegee University to develop a method of transforming heat into electricity to make green energy more affordable.

As of 2022, Johnson has three technology-development companies, Excellatron Solid State, LLC, Johnson Energy Storage, and Johnson Electro-Mechanical Systems (JEMS), operating in the Sweet Auburn neighborhood of Atlanta, Georgia. JEMS has developed the Johnson Thermo-Electrochemical Converter System (JTEC) which Popular Mechanics listed as one of the top 10 inventions of 2009. Johnson Energy Storage has developed a solid-state battery and as of early 2023 is raising funds to develop a demonstration manufacturing line.

Johnson is a "part of a small group of African-American inventors  whose work accounts for 6 percent of all U.S. patent applications.

Super Soaker
Johnson first conceived the Super Soaker while doing work with the U.S. Air Force. Initially called the “Power Drencher” when it first appeared in toy shops in 1990, it eventually got its trademark name after some tweaks and remarketing. Selling between $10 to $60 depending on the model, the Super Soaker took off, generating $200 million in sales in 1991. Shortly after making the deal for the Super Soaker with the Larami Corporation, Larami became a subsidiary of Hasbro Inc. in February 1995.

Johnson tweaked the design of the water gun, replacing the water in the Super Soaker with a "toy [Nerf] projectile."

In February 2013 Johnson filed suit against Hasbro after he discovered that he was being underpaid royalties for the Super Soaker and several Nerf line of toys. In November 2013, Johnson was awarded nearly $73 million in royalties from Hasbro Inc. in arbitration. According to Hasbro, the Super Soaker is approaching sales of $1 billion.

Accolades 
Johnson holds more than 250 patents, most of which are for his Super Soaker. Johnson was awarded the Air Force Achievement Medal and the Air Force Commendation Medal. He received several awards from NASA for his work in spacecraft system design at the Jet Propulsion Laboratory. In 2008, he was awarded the Breakthrough Award from science magazine Popular Mechanics for his work related to JTEC and was inducted into the State of Alabama Engineering Hall of Fame in 2011. In 2015, the Super Soaker was inducted into the National Toy Hall of Fame. In 2022, Johnson was inducted into the National Inventors Hall of Fame.

Personal life 
Johnson is currently married to Linda Moore. They have four children and live in the Ansley Park district of Atlanta, Georgia.

References

General references

External links 

 Profile, Johnson R&D

1949 births
20th-century American inventors
African-American engineers
African-American inventors
African-American scientists
American scientists
American aerospace engineers
Living people
People from Mobile, Alabama
21st-century African-American people
20th-century African-American people
Inventors from Alabama